For the BSP politician, see Ravinder Kumar Molhu.

Ravinder Kumar  (1933 – 6 April 2001) was an Indian historian of Kashmiri descent

He was for many years the Director of the Nehru Memorial Museum and Library in Delhi. He was also the Chairman of the Indian Council of Historical Research, New Delhi.

Partial list of publications
The Bombay Textile Strike, 1919 
The Leopard and the Tail
The Rowlatt Satyagraha in Lahore
From Swaraj to Purna Swaraj: Nationalist politics in the city of Bombay, 1920-32

References

Further reading

Historians of South Asia
Kashmiri people
1933 births
2001 deaths
20th-century Indian historians